Gospić is a town in the mountainous and sparsely populated region of Lika, Croatia. It is the administrative centre of Lika-Senj County. Gospić is located near the Lika River in the middle of a karst field (Ličko Polje).

Gospić is the third smallest seat of a county government in Croatia. Its status as the county capital helped to spur some development in it, but the town as well as the entire region have suffered a constant decrease in population over the last several decades. Scientist and inventor Nikola Tesla was born in the nearby village of Smiljan and grew up in Gospić.

Municipality

 Aleksinica, population 169
 Barlete, population 28
 Bilaj, population 162
 , population 25
 Brušane, population 134
 Budak, population 151
 Bužim, population 74
 Debelo Brdo I, population 61
 Debelo Brdo II, population 8
 Divoselo, population 4
 Donje Pazarište, population 125
 Drenovac Radučki, population 0
 Gospić, population 6,575
 Kalinovača, population 94
 Kaniža Gospićka, population 401
 Klanac, population 100
 Kruščica, population 0
 Kruškovac, population 20
 Kukljić, population 13
 Lički Čitluk, population 4
 Lički Novi, population 298
 Lički Osik, population 1,914
 Lički Ribnik, population 93
 Mala Plana, population 7
 Medak, population 62
 Mogorić, population 110
 Mušaluk, population 228
 Novoselo Bilajsko, population 112
 Novoselo Trnovačko, population 84
 Ornice, population 6
 Ostrvica, population 16
 Oteš, population 99
 Pavlovac Vrebački, population 33
 Počitelj, population 4
 Podastrana, population 51
 Podoštra, population 177
 Popovača Pazariška, population 93
 Rastoka, population 33
 Rizvanuša, population 29
 Smiljan, population 418
 Smiljansko Polje, population 135
 Široka Kula, population 116
 Trnovac, population 96
 Vaganac, population 30
 Velika Plana, population 52
 , population 47
 Vranovine, population 43
 Vrebac, population 44
 Zavođe, population 4
 Žabica, population 163

History

The first organised inhabitation of the area was recorded in 1263 as Kaseg or Kasezi. The name Gospić is first mentioned in 1604, which likely originates from the Croatian word for "lady" (gospa) or another archaic form, gospava. It was ruled by Ottoman Empire as part of Sanjak of Lika initially in Rumeli Eyalet (1528–1580), later in Bosnia Eyalet (1580–1686).

Today's town was built around two Ottoman forts (the towers of Aga Senković and of Aga Alić). The Turkish incursion was repelled by the end of the 17th century and Gospić became an administrative centre of the Lika region within the Military Frontier.

Until 1918, Gospić (named GOSPICH before 1850) was part of the Austrian monarchy (Kingdom of Croatia-Slavonia after the compromise of 1867), in the Croatian Military Frontier, Likaner Regiment N° I. In the late 19th century and early 20th century, Gospić was part of the Lika-Krbava County of the Kingdom of Croatia-Slavonia.

During the Genocide of Serbs by the Ustaše in WWII, the district of Gospić experienced the first large-scale massacres which occurred in the Lika region, as some 3,000 Serb civilians were killed between late July and early August 1941. A concentration camp was established in Gospić in which (together with other camps that belonged to the same complex) the Ustaše might have killed between 24,000-42,000 people, most of them being Serbs and Jews, but some of the prisoners were also Croatian.

In the 1990s, during the course of the Croatian War of Independence, Gospić suffered greatly during the Battle of Gospić. The town was held by Croatian government forces throughout the war, while the rebel Serb forces of the Republic of Serbian Krajina occupied positions directly to the east and often bombarded the town from there. In February 1992, a statue of the Serb scientist Nikola Tesla in downtown Gospić was destroyed in an explosion. The perpetrators were never apprehended. The town was the site of the Gospić massacre, where between 100-120 predominantly Serb civilians were killed by Croatian military units. Control of the area finally devolved to the Croatian government with the success of Operation Storm in August 1995.

Gospic is also the site of one of the regional branches of the Croatian State Archives, the Državni arhiv Gospić, at Kaniška 17. It was founded 30 September 1999 and officially opened 1 September 2000 in a renovated building and now houses historical documents of relevance to the Lika-Senj region which were formerly housed in the Regional Archive at Karlovac. In 2013, Croatian Prime Minister Zoran Milanović urged the town's authorities to allow for a replica of the Tesla statue that had been destroyed in 1992 to be reinstated. The mayor of Gospić, Nikola Kolić, refused to give his approval for such a move and instead vowed to erect a statue of wartime Croatian President Franjo Tuđman on the spot where the Tesla statue had once stood.

People
 Šime Starčević, priest and linguist
 Josip Filipović, Austro-Hungarian general
 Ante Starčević, politician and writer
 Ferdinand Kovačević, engineer and inventor
 Nikola Tesla, scientist and inventor
 Miroslav Kraljević, painter
 Marko Orešković, Partisan and People's Hero of Yugoslavia
 Kata Pejnović, feminist and politician
 Edo Kovačević, artist
 Milan Mandarić, businessman
 Josip Čorak, wrestler
 Nikica Valentić, politician
 Darko Milinović, gynecologist and politician

Gallery

Climate
Gospić is also quite a rainy city, with a slight summer minimum, but it experiences plentiful precipitation all year long, with the maximum being in autumn. During winter, Gospić can get strong blizzards, with on average 5.1 days a year when more than  falls, and 16.1 days when more than  falls.

Demographics

See also
 Roman Catholic Diocese of Gospić-Senj
 Nikola Tesla Memorial Center

References

External links

 City of Gospić (Croatian)

 
Cities and towns in Croatia
Populated places in Lika-Senj County
13th-century establishments in Croatia
1263 establishments in Europe